Blue Planet Software, Inc. is an American video game developer and publisher founded by Henk Rogers in Honolulu, Hawaii in 1996. The company was founded as the successor to Bullet-Proof Software, Inc., founded in 1983 by Rogers in Japan, which closed at the end of March 2001. 

Roger's daughter, Maya Rogers, became CEO in 2014.

List of games

References

External links
Blue Planet Software, Inc. page
Bullet Proof Software, Inc. page

Companies based in Honolulu
Video game companies established in 1996
Video game development companies
Software companies based in Hawaii
1996 establishments in Hawaii